Kırklartepesi is a village in the Rize District, Rize Province, in Black Sea Region of Turkey. Its population is 200 (2021).

History 
According to list of villages in Laz language book (2009), name of the village is Kandeva.

Geography

References

Villages in Rize District